The U.S. Salinity Laboratory is a National Laboratory for research on salt-affected soil-plant-water systems. It resorts under the Agricultural Research Service (ARS) of the United States Department of Agriculture (USDA) and is located in Riverside, California, U.S.A.

The mission of its staff is to develop, amongst other, new knowledge and technology for crop production on salt-affected lands.

History
The Lab started its operations in 1947 at Riverside.

In 1954 one of the first all encompassing publications, the USDA Agriculture Handbook No. 60, has seen the light

Research focus

Saline  and  alkali  soil  conditions  reduce  the  value  and  productivity  of  considerable  areas  of  land  in  the  United States. The  problem  is  an  old  one,  and  there  is  much  information  on  this  subject  in  the  technical  literature. Many  crop  failures  result  from  growing  crops  that have  low  salt  tolerance. Alfalfa,  barley,  sugar  beets, and  cotton  are  tolerant  crops  that  can  often  be  grown where  salinity  is  a  problem.

Data bases
The Salinity Laboratory keeps data bases of salt tolerance of crops divided into 5 groups: 1) Fiber, Grain and Special Crops, 2) Grasses and Forage Crops, 3) Vegetables and Fruit Crops, 4) Woody Crops, 5) Ornamental Shrubs, Trees and Ground Cover.

Salinity models
Software for quite a number of soil salinity models covering different aspects was developed at Riverside, including the Hydrus model and the Van Genuchten–Gupta model.

References

External links

Agricultural research institutes in the United States
Research institutes in California